This is a list of sculpture parks by country.

Africa

Morocco
Anima Garden,  from Marrakech just off the Ourika road

South Africa
Sculpture Garden of the Kirstenbosch National Botanical Garden, Cape Town

Zimbabwe
Chapungu Sculpture Park, Harare

Asia

China
 Changchun World Sculpture Park, Changchun City, Jilin Province
 Guangzhou Sculpture Park, Guangzhou, "China's largest thematic sculpture park"
 Guilin Yuzi Paradise (愚自乐园). "This large scale park hosts land art and contemporary sculpture featuring over 200 works by 140 artists from 47 different nations. On the grounds of Yuzi Paradise (or 'Fool's Paradise') is also the Hotel of Modern Art."
 Wuhu Sculpture Park, Wuhu City, Anhui Province, China

 Zobon City Sculpture Garden, Shanghai

 More sculpture parks in China—listed on Birkbeck, University of London page You can add them in this section.

India

Malampuzha Dam garden, Kerala
Nek Chand's Rock Garden, Chandigarh
Ramoji Film City, near Hyderabad, India
The Sculpture Park at Madhavendra Palace, Nahargarh Fort, Jaipur

Japan
Benesse House Museum, Naoshima Island
Hakone Open-Air Museum, Hakone, Kanagawa Prefecture
Pierlugi Manciniart Sculpture Park,Kani,Gifu Prefecture

Laos
Bunleua Sulilat's Buddha Park

Philippines
APEC Sculpture Garden, CCP Complex, Pasay

Singapore

Sengkang Sculpture Park

South Korea
Baemikkumi Sculpture Park

Taiwan
 Fengle Sculpture Park, Taichung
 Stone Sculpture Park, New Taipei

Thailand

Bunleua Sulilat's Sala Keoku, Nong Khai

Vietnam
Artika Sculpture Park
Ta Phin, Sa Pa, Lao Cai, Viet Nam

Europe

Austria 

Österreichischer Skulpturenpark (Austrian Sculpture Park), sculpture park with outdoor sculptures of contemporary Austrian and international artists in Unterpremstätten, 7 km south of the Styrian capital Graz
 Skulpturenpark Artpark, urban sculpture garden in Linz, Upper Austria. Sculptures are permanently exhibited.

Belgium
 Brussels Park, Brussels
 Hugo Voeten Collection Sculpture Park (Beeldentuin Kunstverzameling Hugo Voeten) in Geel
 Middelheim Open Air Sculpture Museum (Beeldentuin Middelheim Museum) in Antwerp

 Parc Astrid, Charleroi

Cyprus
 Museum of Underwater Sculpture - at Ayia Napa - underwater museum off the coast of Cypress

Denmark
Copenhagen Naturlagepladsen Himmelhoj

Tørskind Gravel Pit, former gravel pit converted to a sculpture park near Egtved, Vejle

France

Cesson-Sévigné and Hédé, towns near Rennes in Brittany, have sculpture gardens dedicated to the work of Jean Boucher.
Chateau La Coste / Villa La Coste - a 500-acre sculpture park on a winery north of Aix-en-Provence, in Provence.
Jardin du Luxembourg, Paris
Kerguehennec near Vannes in Brittany with contemporary sculptures
Musée Rodin in Paris has an extensive sculpture garden featuring many of Auguste Rodin's most famous works.
Parc de sculptures Engelbrecht in the gardens and former farming fields of the Château des Fougis (Thionne in Allier, Auvergne). Giant steel sculptures of German artist Erich Engelbrecht.
Tuileries Garden outside the Louvre, Paris, including works by Aristide Maillol

Germany

 Skulpturen Park Köln in Cologne; features contemporary sculptures (1997–2009)
 Skulpturengarten Damnatz, founded by Klaus and Monika Müller-Klug
 Skulpturengarten Passentin (Mecklenburg-Vorpommern), established by Dorothee Rätsch
 Skulpturenpark Waldfrieden, Wuppertal

Hungary

Memento Park (Szoborpark), statue park in the outskirts of Budapest, which houses the statues from Communist times which are "no longer required"

Ireland

Sculpture in the Parklands, Lough Boora, Co. Offaly
Victoria's Way, Roundwood

Italy
Collezione Gori - Fattoria di Celle, Santomato di Pistoia

Parco della scultura di Castelbuono di Bevagna
Parco Scultura La Palomba, Matera

Lithuania
Europos Parkas near Vilnius
Grūtas Park (aka Stalin's World), a collection of monumental Soviet-era statues and other ideological relics, about 130 km southeast of Vilnius
Hill of Witches, Juodkrantė, near the Baltic Sea
Lithuanian Museum of Ancient Beekeeping in northeastern Lithuania

Netherlands

Beeldenpark van het Kröller-Müller Museum, the sculpture park of the Kröller-Müller Museum situated in Hoge Veluwe National Park. It is one of the finest examples of a sculpture park in Europe, with in their collection art of Auguste Rodin, Henry Moore, Barbara Hepworth, Richard Serra, Jean Dubuffet, Mark di Suvero, Lucio Fontana, Fritz Wotruba and Claes Oldenburg.

Norway

Ekebergparken Sculpture Park, Oslo
Kistefos Sculpture Park, Jevnaker

Peer Gynt Sculpture Park, Oslo
Vigeland Sculpture Park, Oslo

Russia

The Summer Garden occupies an island between the Fontanka River, Moyka River, and the Swan Canal in Saint Petersburg, and shares its name with the adjacent Summer Palace of Peter the Great.

Slovenia 

 Forma Viva Sculpture Park, Božidar Jakac Art Museum, Kostanjevica na Krki 
 Forma viva Sculpture Park, Seča pri Portorožu

Spain

 Meatzalde Goikoa Parke, La Arboleda, Bizkaia. The first exhibition open space dedicated to the sculpture in the Basque Country. Near the Guggenheim Museum of Bilbao.
 Parcart, 17244 Cassà de la Selva, Province of Girona. This sculpture park was founded by Jaume Roser in 2003. It has more than 300 sculptures by different artists.

Sweden
Ladonia, illegal sculpture park
Millesgården Museum, Stockholm
 Wanas Sculpture Park

Switzerland
Bruno Weber Park in Dietikon and Spreitenbach

Sculpture at Schoenthal, near Basel

United Kingdom

Artparks Sculpture Park, in Guernsey and elsewhere in the UK
Barbara Hepworth Museum, in St Ives, Cornwall, south-west England, preserves Barbara Hepworth's studio and garden much as they were when she lived and worked there
Broomhill Sculpture Gardens, in Muddiford, Barnstaple, North Devon, south-west England. A collection of over 300 sculptures sited in 15 acres of woodland garden and river meadow.
Cass Sculpture Foundation, West Sussex, England
Chatsworth House in Derbyshire. While not a sculpture park as such, the owners of Chatsworth, the Duke and Duchess of Devonshire, have collected and commissioned sculpture to be permanently sited on the estate. These include works by Barry Flanagan, Elisabeth Frink, and William Turnbull in the garden, and commissions by artists Tim Harrisson, David Nash, Allen Jones, Nigel Ross and Alison Crowther in the  park designed by Capability Brown. Since 2006 Chatsworth has hosted 'Beyond Limits', a modern and contemporary sculpture exhibition in the gardens, in conjunction with Sotheby's auction house. This landmark selling exhibition takes place during the months of September and October, annually.
Chopwell Wood, Tyne and Wear, England.
Churt, Surrey is home to The Sculpture Park, an exhibition located in an arboretum and water garden.
Elemental Sculpture Park, Cirencester. England
Forest of Dean Sculpture Trail in the Forest of Dean in the county of Gloucestershire, England; links several different site-specific sculptures commissioned for the forest

Grizedale Forest sculpture trail
Irwell Sculpture Trail, the largest public art scheme in the United Kingdom, commissioning regional, national and international artists. It follows a well established  footpath stretching from Salford Quays through Bury into Rossendale and up to the Pennines above Bacup.
Jupiter Artland, near Edinburgh
Kielder Forest, Northumberland, England
Tout Quarry Sculpture Park, Isle of Portland, Dorset, the first sculpture park in a quarry in the UK. Started in 1983 by the Portland Sculpture and Quarry Trust. Includes the work "Still Falling" by Antony Gormley. Tout Quarry is an international venue for a yearly programme of stone carving and sculpture courses that teach skills in direct carving, lettercutting, relief carving and architectural detail. Tout Quarry is also a creative and educational resource for visitors, schools, colleges and universities who come to learn about stone through the Portland Sculpture and Quarry Trust.
 Wyndcliffe Court Sculpture Garden, two exhibitions throughout the year, Spring and Summer with an ever-changing exhibit.

Yorkshire Sculpture Park, West Yorkshire, England

North America

Canada
Animaland Park, defunct sculpture garden and amusement park in New Brunswick
Boreal Sculpture Garden, St Johns, Newfoundland
Canadian Centre for Architecture, museum and research centre in Montreal, Quebec. The architect Phyllis Lambert is the founder
Haliburton Sculpture Forest, Dysart et al, Ontario
Humanics Sanctuary and Sculpture Park, outdoor sculpture park and walking trail in Ottawa, Ontario.
Jean Drapeau Park outdoor sculptures in Montreal, Quebec.
Jeffrey Rubinoff Sculpture Park, Hornby Island, British Columbia
Jock Hildebrand Sculpture Park, outdoor sculpture garden in Westbank, British Columbia
René Lévesque Park sculpture park in Montreal, Quebec.
Toronto Sculpture Garden
Windsor Sculpture Park (formerly Odette Sculpture Park), Windsor, Ontario

Mexico
Calle Obregon Boulevard Park in Colonia Roma, Mexico City
 (The) Cancun and Isla Mujeres Underwater Museum, West Coast National Park of Isla Mujeres, Punta Cancún
Las Pozas, Xilitla, San Luis Potosí

United States

Alabama
 Charles W. Ireland Sculpture Garden, Birmingham Museum of Art, Birmingham
 Geri Moulton Sculpture Park (USA Children's Park), University of South Alabama Children's & Women's Hospital, Mobile
 Woods Quad Sculpture Garden, University of Alabama, Tuscaloosa

Arizona
 (Jack) Jamesen Memorial Sculpture Park, Sedona, Arizona
 Sedona Arts Center Sculpture Garden, Sedona
 (Alene Dunlop) Smith Garden, Tucson
 Tempe Arts Center and Sculpture Park, Tempe

Arkansas
Big Rock Sculpture Park, North Little Rock
Hot Springs Sculpture Garden, Hot Springs
Ozarks Woodland Sculpture Garden, Huntsville

California

 (The Mary and Harry) Blanchard Sculpture Garden, Santa Cruz
 Desert Christ Park, Yucca Valley
 (Robert) Gumbiner Sculpture and Events Garden, Long Beach
 (May S.) Marcy Sculpture Court and Garden, San Diego
 Franklin D. Murphy Sculpture Garden, UCLA, Los Angeles
  New Guinea Sculpture Garden at Stanford, Stanford
 Queen Califia's Magical Circle, Escondido
 Roseville Sculpture Park, Roseville
 Runnymede Sculpture Farm, Woodside
 Norton Simon Museum Sculpture Garden, Pasadena
  Stanford University, Outdoor Art, Palo Alto
 (Fran and Ray) Stark Sculpture Garden, Los Angeles
 Wildwood Farm Sculpture Garden Kenwood

Colorado
Benson Sculpture Garden /Benson Park Sculpture Garden, Loveland
Colorado Springs Fine Art Center Sculpture Courtyard and Sculpture Garden, Colorado Springs
Leaning Tree Museum and Sculpture Garden, Boulder
Museum of Outdoor Arts, Englewood

Connecticut
Aldrich Contemporary Art Museum, Ridgefield
(Edward Tufte's) Hogpen Hill Farms, Woodbury
 I-Park in East Haddam
Kouros Gallery Sculpture Center, Ridgefield
Yale Center for British Art, New Haven

Delaware
Copeland Sculpture Garden, Wilmington

District of Columbia
Hirshhorn Museum and Sculpture Garden, Washington, D.C., on the National Mall and designed by architect Gordon Bunshaft. It is part of the Smithsonian Institution.
National Gallery of Art Sculpture Garden
Statues of the Liberators

Florida
Crealdé School of Art Sculpture Garden, Winter Park
(Martin Z.) Marguiles Sculpture Park, Miami
(The Ann) Norton Sculpture Gardens, Inc., West Palm Beach
Albin Polasek Museum and Sculpture Gardens, Winter Park
Polk Museum of Art Sculpture Garden, Lakeland
Sculpture Key West, Key West

Georgia
Robert T. Webb Sculpture Garden, Dalton

Hawaii
Spalding House sculpture garden, Honolulu - (closed)

Illinois
Barrington Library Sculpture Garden, Barrington
Cedarhurst Center for the Arts, Mount Vernon
Chicago Art Institute, Chicago
Chicago Athenaeum's International Sculpture Park, Schaumburg
Chicago Museum of Contemporary Art Sculpture Garden, Chicago
Farnsworth House, Plano
(Nathan) Manilow Sculpture Park, University Park
Museum of Science and Industry Front Lawn, Chicago
Navy Pier Walk, Chicago
Oakton Sculpture Park, Des Plaines
St. Charles Park District, St. Charles
Skokie Northshore Sculpture Park, Skokie
Wandell Sculpture Garden, Urbana
Wood Street Gallery and Sculpture Garden, Chicago

Indiana
ARTSPARK, Indianapolis Art Center, Indianapolis
Sculpture Trails Outdoor Museum, Solsberry
Virginia B. Fairbanks Art & Nature Park: 100 Acres, Newfields, Indianapolis

Iowa
Des Moines Art Center, Des Moines
Iowa State University Collection, Ames
(John and Mary) Pappajohn Sculpture Park, Des Moines

Kansas
 (Martin H.) Bush Outdoor Sculpture Collection, Wichita
 Johnson Community College Sculpture Collection, Overland Park

Kentucky
 Josephine Sculpture Park, Frankfort

Louisiana
 (Sydney & Walda) Besthoff Sculpture Garden, New Orleans
 Chauvin Sculpture Garden, Chauvin
 Neill Corporation Sculpture Gardens, Hammond

Maryland
 Annmarie Garden, Dowell
 Baltimore Museum of Art Sculpture Garden, Baltimore
 Bufano Sculpture Garden, Baltimore
 Glenstone, Potomac
 Quiet Waters Park, Outdoor Sculptures, Annapolis
 Strathmore Sculpture Garden, North Bethesda
 (Janet and Allen) Wurtzburger and Ryda and Robert H. Levi Sculpture Gardens, Baltimore

Massachusetts

 Arts on the Point, Boston
 Butler Sculpture Park, Sheffield
 Cambridge Arts Council, Cambridge
DeCordova Museum and Sculpture Park, Lincoln
 Forest Hills Trust, Boston
 List Visual Arts Center (MIT campus), Cambridge
Mass MOCA, North Adams
Dr. Seuss Memorial, sculpture garden located at the Quadrangle in Springfield
 Somerby's Landing Sculpture Park, Newburyport
Turn Park Art Space, West Stockbridge

Michigan
 (City of) Brighton Walking Sculpture Garden, Brighton
 Cranbrook Academy, Bloomfield Hills
 Krasl Art Center, St. Joseph
 Lakenenland, Marquette
Frederik Meijer Gardens and Sculpture Park, Grand Rapids Township in Kent County, a  botanical garden and outdoor sculpture park
Michigan Legacy Art Park, Thompsonville
 Northern Michigan University Sculpture Walk, Marquette
 Western Michigan University Sculpture Tour Program, Kalamazoo

Minnesota
 Caponi Art Park and Learning Center], Eagan, a  wooded sculpture garden and performance space
 Franconia Sculpture Park, Shafer
General Mills Art Collection Sculpture Program, Minneapolis
Minneapolis Sculpture Garden, Minneapolis, an  park near the Walker Art Center
North High Bridge Sculpture Garden & Park, Saint Paul
 Western Sculpture Park, Saint Paul

Mississippi
 Yokna Sculpture Trail, Oxford

Missouri
 Blanke Sculpture Terrace, St. Louis
 Daum Museum of Contemporary Art, Sedalia
 Jeske Sculpture Park, Ferguson
 Kansas City Sculpture Park, Kansas City
 Kemper Museum of Art, Kansas City
Laumeier Sculpture Park, St. Louis
 Henry Lay Sculpture Park, St. Louis University campus, Louisiana
 Serra Sculpture Park, St. Louis

Montana
 Bozeman Sculpture Park, Bozeman
 Tippet Rise Art Center, Fishtail

Nebraska
Carhenge near Alliance
 Prairie Peace Park, Lincoln
 Sheldon Memorial Art Gallery and Sculpture Garden at UNL, Lincoln

Nevada
 Goldwell Open Air Museum, Amargosa Valley
 Michael Hizer's Double Negative, Overton
Nevada Museum of Art, Reno

New Hampshire
Andres Institute of Art, Brookline
Bedrock Gardens, Lee

New Jersey

Burlington County College Sculpture Park, Pemberton
Clifton Municipal Sculpture Park, Clifton
Grounds For Sculpture, Hamilton Township, a  garden and museum founded by J. Seward Johnson, Jr., grandson of Johnson & Johnson founder Robert Wood Johnson
Ironstone Sculpture Garden, Woodstown
 Newark Museum Sculpture Garden, Newark
 (John B.) Putnam, Jr., Memorial Collection, Princeton
Quietude Garden Gallery, East Brunswick

New Mexico
Albuquerque Museum Sculpture Garden, Albuquerque
 (Phil & Olga) Eaton Sculpture Garden, Albuquerque
 El Ancon Sculpture Park, Ribera
 Lightning Field, Corrales
Lumina Sculpture Garden, Taos
 Shidoni Gallery and Sculpture Garden, Tesuque

New York
 Adirondack - Sacandaga River Sculpture Park, Wells
 Albright–Knox Art Gallery, Buffalo
 Art Omi, Ghent
 Battery Park City Outdoor Sculptures, Manhattan
 Bradford Graves Sculpture Park, Kerhonkson
 Buckhorn, Pound Ridge
 (Iris & Gerald) Cantor Roof Garden, Manhattan
 Central Park Conservancy Sculpture Tour, Manhattan
 Circle Museum, Austerlitz
 The Cloisters, Manhattan
 Dia Beacon, Beacon, NY
 DIA Foundation, Manhattan
 André Emmerich Top Gallant Farm, Pawling
 Everson Museum of Art, Syracuse
 The Fields Sculpture Park, Ghent
 Griffis Sculpture Park, Ashford Hollow
 Hofstra University Sculpture Garden, Hempstead
Donald M. Kendall Sculpture Gardens at PepsiCo Headquarters, Purchase
 Kykuit Gardens, North Tarrytown
 LongHouse Reserve, East Hampton
 The C Lyon Sculpture Garden, Horseheads
 MoMA Abby Aldrich Rockefeller Sculpture Garden, Manhattan
Morgan Library & Museum, Manhattan
Museum of Jewish Heritage Living Memorial to the Holocaust, Manhattan
 Nassau County Museum of Art and Sculpture, Roslyn Harbor
 Neuberger Museum of Art and Sculpture Garden, Purchase
 Louise Nevelson Plaza, Manhattan
 Isamu Noguchi Garden Museum, Long Island City
 OPUS 40, Saugerties
 Pacem in Terris, Warwick
 Plattsburgh Sculpture Park at the State University of New York, Plattsburgh
 Pratt Institute Sculpture Park, Brooklyn
 PS-1 Contemporary Art Center/NYMMA, Long Island City
 Rocky Point Park and Preserve, Rocky Point
 Salem Art Works (SAW), Salem
 Sculpture Center, Long Island City
 Sculpture Space, Utica
 Socrates Sculpture Park, Long Island City
 The Solo Sculpture Garden by The C Lyon, Horseheads
 Stone Ledge Sculpture Garden, Plattsburgh
 Stone Quarry Hill Art Park, Cazenovia
Storm King Art Center, Mountainville, a "sculpture landscape"
 Studio Museum in Harlem Sculpture Garden, Manhattan
 Taconic Sculpture Park, Spencertown
 Unison Arts and Learning Center, New Paltz

North Carolina
 Carolina Bronze Sculpture Garden and Foundry, Seagrove
 Chapel Hill Public Arts Program, Chapel Hill
 Davidson Sculpture Garden, Davidson
 North Carolina Museum of Art Park, Raleigh
 Western North Carolina Sculpture Park Happy Valley, North Carolina
 Winston-Salem State Sculpture Garden, Winston-Salem

Ohio
 Columbus Museum of Art Sculpture Park, Columbus
 Pyramid Hill Sculpture Park, Hamilton
 Rio Grande Sculpture Park, Rio Grande
 Rosenthal Contemporary Arts Center, Cincinnati
 The Sculpture Center, Cleveland
 Topiary Park, Columbus
 University of Cincinnati - Fine Arts Collection, Outdoor Sculpture garden Cincinnati
 (Georgia and David K.) Welles Sculpture Garden, Toledo

Oklahoma
Philbrook Museum of Art, Tulsa

Oregon
 Evan H. Roberts Sculpture Mall, Portland

Pennsylvania
 Abington Art Center Sculpture Garden, Jenkintown
 (Philip and Muriel) Berman Sculpture Park, Allentown
 (Madeline K.) Butcher Sculpture Garden and the Morris Arboretum, Philadelphia
Drexel University, Philadelphia
 Fairmount Park / International Sculpture Garden, Philadelphia
 Kentuck Knob, Chalkhill
Lookout Sculpture Park, Damascus
 (Patricia D.) Pfundt Sculpture Garden, Doylestown
 Pittston Susquehanna River Sculpture Park, Pittston
 Rhoneymeade Arboretum and Sculpture Garden, Centre Hall
 (James) Wolf Sculpture Trail, Johnstown
The Bower: Native Garden and Sculpture Park, Shermans Dale

Puerto Rico
 Sculpture Garden of the Museo de Arte de Puerto Rico, San Juan

South Carolina
Brookgreen Gardens, Murrells Inlet
 Jackson Gallery & Sculpture Garden, Aiken
 South Carolina Botanical Garden and Sculpture Garden, Clemson

South Dakota

Porter Sculpture Park, Montrose
 Presidents Park Sculpture Garden, Lead

Tennessee
 Cheekwood - Carell Sculpture Trail, Nashville
 Hunter Museum of American Art, Sculpture Garden, Chattanooga
 (Charles) Krutch Park, Knoxville
 Montague Park, Sculpture Fields Chattanooga
 River Gallery Sculpture Garden, Chattanooga

Texas

 Benini Foundation and Sculpture Ranch, Johnson City
 Blossom Street Gallery & Sculpture Garden, Houston
 Buffalo Bayou Artpark, Houston
Cadillac Ranch, Amarillo
 Chinati Foundation, Marfa
 (Lillie and Hugh Roy) Cullen Sculpture Garden, Houston
Dallas Museum of Art, Dallas
 Huntington Sculpture Foundation, Coupland
Liberty Hill International Sculpture Park, Liberty Hill
 McNay Art Museum, San Antonio
 Meadows Museum Sculpture Plaza, Dallas
 (The) Menil Collection, Houston
Nasher Sculpture Center, Dallas
 NorthPark Center, Dallas
 Rachofsky House, Dallas
 Rice University, James Turrell Skyspace, Houston
 Rothko Chapel & Sculpture Reflection Pool, Houston
 San Antonio Museum of Art Sculpture Garden, San Antonio
 Strake Jesuit College Preparatory, Houston
 Texas Sculpture Garden, Frisco
 Umlauf Sculpture Garden and Museum, Austin

Utah

 Gilgal Sculpture Garden by Thomas Childs, Salt Lake City
 Metaphor: The Tree of Utah by Karl Momen, near Wendover
 Spiral Jetty by Robert Smithson, near Brigham City (in the Great Salt Lake)

Vermont
 Marble Street Sculpture Park, West Rutland
 North Bennington Art Park, North Bennington
 Spirit of Place, Huntington
 Vermont Arts Council, Montpelier
 West Branch Gallery and Sculpture Park, Stowe
 West Rutland Art Park, West Rutland

Virginia
National Memorial Park, Falls Church
Virginia Museum of Fine Arts, Richmond

Washington

 Earth Sanctuary Sculpture Garden, Whidbey Island
Monarch Contemporary Art Center and Sculpture Park, Olympia
Olympic Sculpture Park, Seattle
 SJI Sculpture Park, Friday Harbor
 Spokane Sculpture Walk, Spokane
 Western Washington University Campus Sculpture, Bellingham
 Whitman College Campus Sculpture, Walla Walla

Wisconsin
 (Margaret Woodson) Fischer Sculpture Gallery, Wausau
 Lynden Sculpture Garden, Milwaukee
 Mississippi River Sculpture Park, Prairie du Chien
 Prairie Moon Sculpture Park, Cochrane
 Stevens Point Sculpture Park, Stevens Point
 Wisconsin Concrete Park, Phillips
 Woodlot Outdoor Sculpture Gallery, Sheboygan

Oceania

Australia

 Glenorchy Art and Sculpture Park (GASP), an award-winning parkland located along the foreshore of Elwick Bay in Glenorchy, Tasmania
 Heide Museum of Modern Art Sculpture Park in Bulleen near Melbourne. Sculptures are permanently exhibited.

 Lyons Sculpture Park,  sculpture park in Lyons, western Victoria

 McClelland Gallery and Sculpture Park, public sculpture garden in Langwarrin near Melbourne
 National Gallery of Australia has a sculpture park from the gallery to the banks of Lake Burley Griffin.  One of the permanent exhibits in the park is a fern garden designed by Fiona Hall.

New Zealand
 Gibbs Farm, Kaipara, Northland
 Hills Golf Course Sculpture Trail, Arrowtown, Otago
 Hotere Garden Oputae, Port Chalmers, Otago
 Waitakaruru Arboretum, Hamilton, Waikato

South America

Brazil

Centro de Arte Contemporânea Inhotim, Brumadinho, Minas Gerais

Colombia

Botero Plaza, Medellín
Hacienda Nápoles, the estate created by drug lord Pablo Escobar and now owned by the Colombian government, boasts of some statues of dinosaurs (built with bones), and pre-historic animals (such as the mammoth, that children can climb and play on), as well as decommissioned military vehicles, and a giant hand sculpture.
Nutibara sculpture park, Medellín

See also
 Ice sculpture
 Outline of sculpture
 Sculpture garden
 Sculpture trail
 Sensory garden

References

Further reading
 Blázquez Abascal, Jimena; Valeria Varas; and Raúl Rispa. (2006). Sculpture Parks in Europe: A Guide to Art and Nature. Basel; Boston: Birkhäuser Architecture. .
 Cigola, Francesca. (2013). Art Parks: A Tour of America's Sculpture Parks and Gardens. New York: Princeton Architectural Press. .
 Harper, Glenn; and Twylene Moyer, eds. (2008). Landscapes for Art: Contemporary Sculpture Parks. Hamilton, NJ: ISC Press; and Seattle: University of Washington Press. .
 McCarthy, Jane; and Laurily Keir Epstein. (1996). A Guide to the Sculpture Parks and Gardens of America. New York: Michael Kesend. .
 Stępnik, Małgorzata; "Modernist sculpture parks and their ideological contexts – on the basis of the oeuvres by Gustav Vigeland, Bernhard Hoetger and Einar Jónsson," The Polish Journal of Aesthetics, No  47 (4/2017), pp. 143–169. e-ISSN 2353-723X / p-ISSN 1643-1243

Lists of art museums and galleries
Parks

Lists by country
Lists of parks
Lists of public art